RTS Widzew Łódź is a Polish football club based in Łódź. The club was founded in 1910. Its official colours are red and white, hence their nicknames Czerwona Armia (Red Army) and Czerwono-biało-czerwoni (Red-white-reds).

History

The club was founded in 1910 as Towarzystwo Miłośników Rozwoju Fizycznego Widzew (Society of Physical Development Fans Widzew). Its name comes from the name of the city district Widzew, while RTS stands for Workers' Sports Association (in Polish Robotnicze Towarzystwo Sportowe). The club was founded by Polish workers and German industrialists who were employees of the Widzew textile manufactory called WIMA. Initially, the club was called the Widzew Association for Physical Development (in Polish: Towarzystwo Miłośników Rozwoju Fizycznego Widzew) because at that time Lodz was under the rule of the Russian Tsar and the adjective "workers'" (in Polish: Robotniczy) could not be used in the club's name. The club's mottos are Together We Create Power (in Polish Razem Tworzymy Siłę) and Always 12 (in Polish Zawsze w 12) which is meant to suggest that its fans are the twelfth player on the team. The club plays its matches at its stadium, located in Łódź at 138 Marszałka Józefa Piłsudskiego Avenue. The stadium bears the unofficial but commonly used name of the Heart of Łódź (in Polish Serce Łodzi).

After the first world war Poland has regained its independence and the club was reactivated in 1922 as Robotnicze Towarzystwo Sportowe Widzew Łódź (Workers' Sports Association Widzew Łódź).

Widzew has won four Polish league championships, in 1981–82, 1982–83, 1996–97 and 1997–98, as well as the 1985 Polish Cup.

After winning back-to-back championships in 1981–82 and 1982–83, Widzew reclaimed the league crown 14 years later after a record season once again. During the successful 1996–97 season, Widzew conceded only 22 goals in 34 matches, the least out of all teams in the league. They were also proficient in attack, scoring 84 goals and securing 88 points across the campaign. Thanks in part to the great performance of their goalkeeper Andrzej Woźniak, the team remained unbeaten for the whole season.

In the following 1996–97 season, the team enjoyed another great season. For the second time in the club's history, they secured back-to-back championships, scoring 74 goals across the season and conceding only 21.

They have appeared in 117 matches in European Cups, of which they won 42. Widzew knocked European giants Manchester United out of the 1980–81 UEFA Cup, although their biggest achievement was reaching the semi-final of the 1982–83 European Cup, eliminating then three-time winners Liverpool along the way.

Recent history

At the beginning of 2007–08 season, Widzew was purchased by one of the wealthiest men in Poland, Sylwester Cacek.

In January 2008, while playing in the second division, the Polish Football Association ruled that Widzew Łódź should be relegated due to their involvement in a corruption scandal. However, Widzew became champions that year and were allowed to stay in the second division, which was renamed I liga before the start of the 2008–09 season. Despite the deduction of six points as a penalty, Widzew managed to become champions once again, and were finally promoted to Ekstraklasa. In total, Widzew played 35 seasons at the highest level before being relegated at the end of the 2013–14 season.

Due to financial problems, Widzew finished last at the end of the 2014–15 season. Subsequently, the club ruled by Sylwester Cacek went bankrupt.

Local businessmen Marcin Ferdzyn and Grzegorz Waranecki decided to take on amateur status as a new association called Stowarzyszenie Reaktywacja Tradycji Sportowych Widzew Łódź (Association of the Reactivation of the Sports Traditions of Widzew Łódź), which continues the tradition of the old RTS Widzew Łódź. The new association was registered in a Polish court on 2 July 2015, and within a few weeks of summer 2015, they managed to hire a new coach Witold Obarek and gather a new roster, which started the 2015–16 season in the fifth tier of Polish football. In their first season in IV liga, Widzew won promotion. In the 2016–17 season, Widzew achieved third place in III liga, behind Drwęca Nowe Miasto Lubawskie and ŁKS Łódź, but next season yielded promotion to II liga. In the 2018–19 season, they finished in fifth place with 55 points. In the 2021–22 season, Widzew finished 2nd, one point ahead of Arka Gdynia, and returned to Ekstraklasa for the first time since the 2013–14 season.

Achievements

Domestic

 Ekstraklasa (First Division):
 Winner (4): 1980–81, 1981–82, 1995–96, 1996–97
 2nd place (7): 1976–77, 1978–79, 1979–80, 1982–83, 1983–84, 1994–95, 1998–99
 I liga (Second Division):
 Winner (3): 2005–06, 2008–09, 2009–10
 Polish Cup:
 Winner (1): 1985
 Polish Super Cup:
 Winner (1): 1996
 Finalist (1): 1997
 Polish League Cup:
 Finalist (1): 1977

Europe
 UEFA Champions League/European Cup:
 Semi-Finalist (1): 1982–83
Copa del Sol:
 Runner-up (1): 2013

Youth Team
 Polish U19 Runner Up: 1995
 Polish U19 Bronze Medal: 1936, 1937, 1997

Results in Ekstraklasa

Widzew in Europe

Current squad

Out on loan

Notable players

 Tadeusz Błachno
 Daniel Bogusz
 Henryk Bolesta
 Ulrich Borowka
 Zbigniew Boniek
 Stanisław Burzyński
 Wiesław Cisek
 Marek Citko
 Ryszard Czerwiec
 Jacek Dembiński
 Dariusz Dziekanowski
 Marek Dziuba
 Dariusz Gęsior
 Andrzej Grębosz
 Rafał Grzelak
 Leszek Iwanicki
 Paweł Janas
 Waldemar Jaskulski
 Tomasz Łapiński
 Sławomir Majak
 Radosław Michalski
 Józef Młynarczyk
 Andrzej Możejko
 Arkadiusz Onyszko
 Kazimierz Przybyś
 Rafał Siadaczka
 Włodzimierz Smolarek
 Michał Stasiak
 Tadeusz Świątek
 Maciej Szczęsny
 Mirosław Szymkowiak
 Mirosław Tłokiński
 Artur Wichniarek
 Jerzy Wijas
 Roman Wójcicki
 Paweł Wojtala
 Andrzej Woźniak
 Wiesław Wraga
 Zbigniew Wyciszkiewicz
 Marcin Zając
 Władysław Żmuda
 Andriy Mikhalchuk
 Alexandru Curtianu

Managers

 Zygmunt Otto (1948)
 Vančo Kaménař (1948)
 Wacław Pegza (1949)
 Władysław Król (1950–51)
 Leszek Jezierski (1972–76) (II liga)
 Janusz Pekowski (1976)
 Paweł Kowalski (1976–77)
 Bronisław Waligóra (1977–79)
 Stanisław Świerk (1978–79)
 Jacek Machciński (1979–81)
 Władysław Jan Żmuda (1981–84)
 Bronisław Waligóra (1984–86)
 Orest Lenczyk (1987–88)
 Andrzej Grębosz (1988–89)
 Bronisław Waligóra (1988–90)
 Jan Tomaszewski (1989–90)
 Czesław Fudalej (1989–90)
 Paweł Kowalski (1990–91) (II liga)
 Władysław Jan Żmuda (April 28, 1992 – May 20, 1993)
 Leszek Jezierski (1992–93)
 Marek Woziński (1993–94)
 Władysław Stachurski (Sept 1, 1993 – April 20, 1995)
 Ryszard Polak (1994–95)
 Franciszek Smuda (April 30, 1995 – May 31, 1998)
 Andrzej Pyrdoł (July 1, 1998 – July 28, 1998)
 Wojciech Łazarek (July 28, 1998 – Oct 26, 1998)
 Marek Dziuba (1998–99)
 Grzegorz Lato (1999–00)
 Orest Lenczyk (Aug 30, 1999 – April 23, 2000)
 Andrzej Pyrdoł (1999–00)
 Jan Żurek (April 24, 2000 – July 1, 2000)
 Petro Kushlyk (2000–01)
 Marek Koniarek (2000–01)
 Marek Kusto (July 3, 2001 – Oct 13, 2001)
 Dariusz Wdowczyk (Oct 13, 2001 – Aug 2, 2002)
 Franciszek Smuda (Aug 2, 2002 – Dec 5, 2002)
 Petr Němec (Dec 6, 2002 – April 7, 2003)
 Tomasz Muchiński (int.) (April 7, 2003 – April 10, 2003)
 Franciszek Smuda (April 10, 2003 – July 9, 2003)
 Andrzej Kretek (July 10, 2003 – Aug 26, 2003)
 Tomasz Łapiński (interim) (Aug 26, 2003 – Sept 2, 2003)
 Jerzy Kasalik (Sept 3, 2003 – March 22, 2004)
 Stefan Majewski (2004–06) (II liga)
 Michał Probierz (June 1, 2006 – Sept 3, 2007)
 Marek Zub (Sept 3, 2007 – April 21, 2008)
 Janusz Wójcik (April 21, 2008–08)
 W. Fornalik (July 1, 2008 – Jan 9, 2009) (I liga nowa)
 P. Janas (Jan 9, 2009 – June 21, 2010) (I liga nowa, I liga)
 A. Kretek (June 25, 2010 – Nov 15, 2010) (Ekstraklasa)
 C. Michniewicz (Nov 15, 2010 – June 22, 2011) (Ekstraklasa)
 R. Mroczkowski (June 24, 2011 – Sept 26, 2013) (Ekstraklasa)
 Rafal Pawlak (Sept 26, 2013 – Jan 6, 2014) (Ekstraklasa)
 Artur Skowronek (Jan 6, 2014 – June 20, 2014) (Ekstraklasa)
 Włodzimierz Tylak (June 20, 2014 – 2014)
 Rafał Pawlak (2014)
 Wojciech Stawowy (2014–2015)
  Witold Obarek (2015)
  Marcin Płuska (2015–16)
  Tomasz Muchiński (2016)
  Przemysław Cecherz (2016–17)
  Franciszek Smuda (2017–2018)
 Radosław Mroczkowski (2018–2019)
 Jacek Paszulewicz (2019)
 Zbigniew Smółka (2019)
 Marcin Kaczmarek (2019–2020)
 Enkeleid Dobi (2020–2021)
 Marcin Broniszewski (2021)
 Janusz Niedźwiedź (2021–)

Stadium
The club's home stadium was the Stadion Miejski opened in 1930. The stadium, which was owned by the city of Łódź, had a capacity of 10,500 seats. In early 2015, it was demolished to make way for a new stadium with 18,000 seats. It was intended the new stadium will be completed by November 2016.

In the 2014–15 season, its last season as a professional club, Widzew played their home matches in Byczyna near Poddębice, 40 km west of Łódź.

After bankruptcy and relegation to the fifth division, a rebuilt team was forced to play its domestic games in Łódź at UKS SMS Łódź stadium, during the construction of a new Widzew's stadium.

The first match on new stadium was played on 18 March 2017, Widzew won against Motor Lubawa 2–0. 17,443 fans attended the game.

Fans
Widzew has one of the largest fan-bases in Poland with fan-clubs all around the country. Widzew's biggest rival is ŁKS Łódź, with whom they contest the Łódź Derby. Legia Warsaw are also big rivals, with whom they contest the Derby of Poland, which stems from the fact there were frequent title races between the two clubs. GKS Bełchatów is third biggest rival of Widzew. Their fans maintain friendly relations with fans of Ruch Chorzów, Elana Toruń, KKS Kalisz, Wisła Kraków and CSKA Moscow.

TMRF Widzew Łódź

TMRF Widzew was a football team created by the active supporters of Widzew in 2014, who were in a long conflict with the club board. Only Widzew supporters were admitted to the squad.

Regular season

See also

 Football in Poland
 List of football teams
 Champions' Cup/League
 UEFA Cup

References

External links

  
 Widzew Łódź at www.90minut.pl 

 
Football clubs in Łódź
Association football clubs established in 1910
1910 establishments in Poland